Quảng Tùng a town and commune (xã) in the district of Quảng trạch, Quang Binh Province, North Central Coast Region of Vietnam. This commune is located on the right bank of Moon River.

Populated places in Quảng Bình province
Communes of Quảng Bình province